Ferenc Geszti (1545–11 May 1595) was a Transylvanian nobleman, the captain of Déva. He belonged to the Geszti family (also Gezthy, Gezti, Gesty, de Gezth). He was a Calvinist. In the beginning of the Long Turkish War (1593–1606) he was one of the main Transylvanian commanders. He and Đorđe Palotić, the Ban of Lugos, helped some Ottoman Christian mutineers at the frontier in the winter of 1593–94; these later grew in numbers and initiated the Uprising in Banat (1594).

References

1545 births
1595 deaths
16th-century Hungarian people
People of the Principality of Transylvania
Hungarian Calvinist and Reformed Christians
16th-century Protestants
People of the Long Turkish War